The following highways are numbered 472:

Canada
Manitoba Provincial Road 472

Japan
 Japan National Route 472

United States 
  Florida State Road 472
  Kentucky Route 472
  Louisiana Highway 472
  Maryland Route 472
  New Mexico State Road 472
  Pennsylvania Route 472
  Puerto Rico Highway 472
  Farm to Market Road 472